Dedicated to You is a 1957 album by the R&B band, The "5" Royales.

Track listing
 "Think"
 "Someone Made You for Me" 
 "Just as I Am"
 "Don't Be Ashamed"
 "Come On and Save Me"
 "I'd Better Make a Move"
 "Dedicated to the One I Love"
 "Right Around the Corner"
 "Say It"
 "Messin' Up"
 "Tears of Joy"
 "Thirty Second Lover"

References 

1957 albums
The "5" Royales albums
King Records (United States) albums